Drew Sidora Pittman (née Jordan; born May 1, 1985) is an American actress and singer. She is known for her recurring role as Chantel in the Disney Channel Original Series That's So Raven, as Lucy Avila in the 2006 film Step Up, as Tionne Watkins in the VH1 TLC biographical film CrazySexyCool: The TLC Story, and the BET comedy-drama television series The Game. She joined the Bravo reality show The Real Housewives of Atlanta in 2020.

Career

Acting
Sidora completed numerous industrial films and was the youngest member of the "Hook Players Theater Ensemble" in Hollywood, California, with residence at the Richard Pryor Theater. At age 9, she appeared in the Fox TV movie Divas, acting alongside Khalil Kain, Lisa Nicole Carson and Nicole Ari Parker.

Besides her roles in That's So Raven, Step Up and Blessed & Cursed, Sidora has also guest starred in Girlfriends  in 2006 as a High School Girl Group recruiter, as well as Without a Trace, The Game, and What I Like About You. She has also appeared in the feature films White Chicks and Never Die Alone, and made a cameo appearance in GLC's single "Honor Me".

In 2013, she was cast as a member Tionne Watkins of the girl group TLC in the group's biopic that aired on VH1. Sidora also starred as Genesis "Genny" Winters in the 2014 BounceTV original One Love.

Reality television
Sidora was added to the cast of the Real Housewives of Atlanta in season 13. She made her debut in December 2020.

Music
Sidora featured on the Step Up (Original Soundtrack) with two songs entitled "For The Love" and "Til The Dawn" in 2006. In 2007, she featured on the Three Can Play That Game soundtrack with a song entitled "Three Can Play". In December 2008, Sidora signed a record deal with Slip-n-Slide Records. In 2010, the album's first single titled "Juke It" was released. She played Trey Songz's lover in the video for "Last Time" of the album Trey Day. She also appears in Yung Berg's "Sexy Lady" video as the girlfriend. She also danced in Sean Paul’s "Give It Up to Me" video.

Personal life
Sidora has a son, Josiah, from a previous relationship. Sidora is married to Ralph Pittman and together they have two children: a son, Machai, born in June 2015, and a daughter, Aniya, born in February 2018. On February 27, 2023, Sidora filed a petition to divorce Pittman.

Filmography

Film

Television

References

External links
 
 Drew Sidora

Living people
21st-century American singers
21st-century American women singers
Actresses from Chicago
African-American actresses
20th-century African-American women singers
American child actresses
American film actresses
American contemporary R&B singers
American television actresses
Singers from Chicago
1985 births
21st-century African-American women singers